Evarra was a genus of small ray-finned fish in the family Cyprinidae. All species in the genus were restricted to waters in the Valley of Mexico and are now extinct due to habitat loss (their habitat dried out with remaining waters in the region highly polluted).

Species 
 †Evarra bustamantei Navarro, 1955 (Mexican dace)
 †Evarra eigenmanni Woolman, 1894 (plateau chub)
 †Evarra tlahuacensis Meek, 1902 (endorheic chub)

References
 

 
Fish of North America becoming extinct since 1500
Freshwater fish of Mexico
Ray-finned fish genera
Taxonomy articles created by Polbot